Christopher Thorman (born 26 September 1980) is an English rugby league coach is head coach of Newcastle Thunder  and a former player. An England international goal-kicking , he previously played in the Engage Super League for Hull F.C. (Heritage No.), Huddersfield Giants, London Broncos (Heritage No. 402) and the Sheffield Eagles, as well as in the National Rugby League for the Parramatta Eels (Heritage No. 668). Following the sacking of Rick Stone as coach of the Huddersfield Giants, he was announced as interim head coach.

Background
Born 26 September 1980 in Wallsend, North Tyneside, Thorman went to Western First School, Western Middle School and then onto Burnside Community High School (now known as Burnside Business and Enterprise College), where he was friends with former England football international Michael Carrick. His first rugby club was Newcastle Eagles (now known as Wallsend Eagles) where he played with his younger brothers, Paul and Neil, as a youngster under the watchful eye of Simon Wilkinson, the club's head coach. He was discovered by a scout and sent to regional camps and other rugby league trials. Playing for [North East U16] more and more scouts discovered the potential the young man had. At 16, he made his professional début playing for the Sheffield Eagles.

Playing career
Thorman scored the fastest hat-trick of tries scored from the start of a match in 6 min 54 sec while playing for Huddersfield Giants against Doncaster Dragons in the semi-final of the Buddies National League Cup at Doncaster, South Yorkshire, on 19 May 2002.

In 2004, Thorman made a highly anticipated move to NRL side the Parramatta Eels.  Thorman struggled with form and only made 11 appearances for the club before leaving Australia and signing with The Huddersfield Giants

His representative honours include 1 game for Yorkshire, 1 game for England "A" and 2 games as England captain. Thorman captained Huddersfield in the 2006 Challenge Cup Final at stand-off half back against St. Helens but the Giants lost 12–42. In June 2007 Thorman was called up to the Great Britain squad for the Test match against France however missed the match with an injury to his thigh.
Thorman signed a 1-year deal for Hull in the 2009 season but after a disappointing season for Hull he was sold to York City Knights.

Coaching career
In June 2012, Thorman announced to be joining Super League's Huddersfield Giants as an assistant coach at the end of the season.

On 3 May 2019, Thorman was appointed head coach at Workington Town, following the departure of former boss Leon Pryce. His move followed his resignation from his first management job at Huddersfield Giants.

References

External links
Giants maintain winning form
Challenge Cup Final 2006
Thorman leaves Parramatta for Huddersfield
Floodlit-Nines Winning Captain, Chris Thorman
Chris Thorman Hull Profile
Thorman Cleared of Biting
(archived by web.archive.org) Thorman talks about Jon Sharp's Departure from the Giants
(archived by web.archive.org) 2008 Superleague Player Profile
Thorman's Drop Goal Seals Victory for the Giants against Bradford Bulls
Yorkshire Post Player Profile 2007

1980 births
Living people
England national rugby league team players
English rugby league coaches
English rugby league players
Huddersfield Giants captains
Huddersfield Giants players
Hull F.C. players
London Broncos players
Newcastle Thunder coaches
Parramatta Eels players
Rugby league five-eighths
Rugby league fullbacks
Rugby league halfbacks
Rugby league players from Wallsend
Sheffield Eagles (1984) players
Workington Town coaches
York City Knights coaches
York City Knights players
Yorkshire rugby league team players